Edward Butler D.C.L. (1686–1745) was an English academic administrator at the University of Oxford.

Butler was awarded a Doctor of Civil Law at Oxford University. He was elected President (head) of Magdalen College, Oxford, on 29 July 1722, a post he held until he died in 1745.
Butler, a Whig, was a politically oriented. He was a significant benefactor to Magdalen College.
During his time as President of Magdalen, Butler was also Vice-Chancellor of Oxford University from 1728 until 1732.

References

Year of birth missing
1745 deaths
Presidents of Magdalen College, Oxford
Vice-Chancellors of the University of Oxford
Members of the Parliament of Great Britain for Oxford University
British MPs 1741–1747